The Shenyang J-5 (Chinese: 歼-5) (NATO reporting name Fresco) is a Chinese-built single-seat jet interceptor and fighter aircraft derived from the Soviet Mikoyan-Gurevich MiG-17. The J-5 was exported as the F-5 and was originally designated Dongfeng-101 (East Wind-101) and also Type 56 before being designated J-5 in 1964.

The MiG-17 was license-built in China and Poland into the 1960s. The People's Liberation Army Air Force (PLAAF) obtained a number of Soviet-built MiG-17 Fresco-A day fighters, designated J-4 in the early 1950s. To introduce modern production methods to Chinese industry the PLAAF obtained plans for the MiG-17F Fresco-C day fighter in 1955, along with two completed pattern aircraft, 15 knockdown kits, and parts for ten aircraft. The first Chinese-built MiG-17F, (serialed Zhong 0101), produced by the Shenyang factory, performed its initial flight on 19 July 1956 with test pilot Wu Keming at the controls.

Plans were obtained in 1961 for the MiG-17PF interceptor and production began, as the J-5A (F-5A), shortly afterwards. At this time the Sino-Soviet split occurred, causing much disruption to industrial and technical projects, so the first J-5A did not fly until 1964, when the type was already obsolete. A total of 767 J-5s and J-5As had been built when production ended in 1969.

The Chinese also built a two-seat trainer version of the MiG-17, designated the Chengdu JJ-5 (Jianjiji Jiaolianji - Fighter Trainer - FT-5), from 1968, by combining the two-seat cockpit of the MiG-15UTI, the VK-1A engine of the J-5, and the fuselage of the J-5A. All internal armament was deleted and a single Nudelman-Richter NR-23 23 mm cannon was carried in a ventral pack. Production of the JJ-5 reached 1,061 when it ceased in 1986, with the type exported to a number of countries.

Operational history

The J-5 and JJ-5 saw widespread use by the PLAAF until supplanted by more capable aircraft the Shenyang J-6 and later Chengdu J-7.

Variants
 Type 56 - pre-service designation for the J-5.
 Dongfeng-101 - original service name for the J-5.
 Shenyang J-5 - (Jianjiji-5 - fighter) Chinese production aircraft re-designated in 1964. 767 built, all single-seat variants.
 Shenyang J-5A - licence production of the radar-equipped Mig-17PF. The total production figure for this variant was over 300. J-5As were still in service with the PLAAF when J-6A & J-6B were phased out.
 Chengdu JJ-5 - (Jianjiji Jiaolianji - fighter trainer) A twin-seat trainer version of the J-5 designed and developed by Chengdu Aircraft Corporation. Combined the J-5 airframe, J-5A airbrakes and the tandem twin-seat cockpit section of the JJ-2 (MiG-15UTI). Export versions designated FT-5.
 Shenyang J-5 torpedo bomber - A single aircraft modified to carry a single torpedo under the fuselage centreline. The central cannon was removed, as was some fuel storage capacity. Trials showed performance degradation was too great and further work was abandoned.

Operators

Current operators

 North Korean Air Force — 106 Shenyang F-5s and 135 Shenyang FT-5s are in service. However, reports of dire levels of serviceability suggest an airworthiness rate of less than 50%.

 Sudanese Air Force — 16 F-5s and FT-5s were delivered in 1969. Another FT-5 was received around 1983. Lastly, two FT-5s might have been ordered in 2001. Sudanese Air Force F-5s might have been used for ground attack missions against members of the Ansar movement in 1970.

Former operators

 Albanian Air Force — Shenyang J-5 jets were among the first Chinese military aid to Albania. However, their deployment against the Yugoslav air incursions was relatively unsuccessful due to their subsonic speed, and the aircraft were soon reassigned once Shenyang J-6s became available. Remaining J-5s are retired and in storage.

 Bangladeshi Air Force — All retired in 1980.

 Khmer Air Force — Ten Shenyang J-5 jets were delivered to the then Royal Khmer Aviation (AVRK) in 1965 as military aid. Only six were operational by 1970, only to be lost in January 1971 when the Cambodian Air Force was almost entirely destroyed on the ground by a North Vietnamese Army sapper attack.

 People's Liberation Army Air Force 
 People's Liberation Army Naval Air Force

 Pakistan Air Force — Retired 5 January 2012. The PAF's No. 1 Fighter Conversion Unit (FCU) operated more than 25 FT-5 trainers from 1975 to 2012, replaced in service by Pakistani-built K-8P Karakorums.

 Sri Lankan Air Force — J-5s were used as jet familiarisation trainers for Sri Lankan Air Force pilots.

 Tanzanian Air Force — Up to 22 FT-5 trainers delivered, starting in 1973.

 United States Air Force — In the 1980s, the United States purchased a number of J-5 aircraft, along with J-2 aircraft from China via the Combat Core Certification Professionals Company. These aircraft were employed in a "mobile threat test" program at Kirtland Air Force Base, operated by 4477th "Red Hats" Test and Evaluation Squadron of the United States Air Force, and are now believed to be in storage.

 Vietnamese Air Force — The Vietnamese Air Force used J-5s alongside the Soviet-supplied MiG-17s for interception missions until the 1990s when they were retired, along with the remaining MiG-19s, being replaced with newer MiG-21s and Su-27s.

 Zambia Air Force - 12 F-5s and FT-5s delivered, probably between 1976 and 1978.

 Air Force of Zimbabwe — Two FT-5s leased by China as trainers for Chengdu F-7s around 1986. They were later replaced by two twin-seat FT-7BZs, and returned to China by the mid-1990s.

Specifications (J-5A)

See also

References
Notes

Bibliography

 
 Gordon, Yefim & Komissarov, Dmitry. Chinese Aircraft. Hikoki Publications. Manchester. 2008. 
 Taylor, Michael J.H. . “ Jane's Encyclopedia of Aviation. Studio Editions. London. 1989. 
 Designations of Soviet and Russian Military Aircraft and Missiles

External links

 J-5 fighter jet, PLAAF China
 JJ-5 Trainer jet, PLAAF China

China–Soviet Union relations
J-05, Shenyang
JJ-05
Shenyang aircraft
Mid-wing aircraft
Single-engined jet aircraft
Aircraft first flown in 1956